Neshoba County is located in the central part of the U.S. state of Mississippi.  As of the 2020 census, the population was 29,087. Its county seat is Philadelphia. It was named after Nashoba, a Choctaw chief. His name means "wolf" in the Choctaw language.

The county is known for the Neshoba County Fair and harness horse races. It is home of the Williams Brothers Store, which has been in operation since the early 1900s.

In June 1964, civil rights workers James Chaney, Andrew Goodman, and Michael Schwerner were chased down, tortured, and murdered by members of the Ku Klux Klan. They were buried in an earthen dam on private property off of Highway 21; Goodman was still alive. Initially treated as a missing persons case, their disappearance provoked national outrage and contributed significantly to the July enactment of the Civil Rights Act by President Johnson.

The Mississippi Band of Choctaw Indians (MBCI), a federally recognized tribe, is based here and has developed one of the largest casino complexes in the state on their reservation, the Pearl River Resort.

History 
At the time of European encounter, this was part of the territory of the historic Choctaw people, who occupied most of what later was defined as Mississippi. Under President Andrew Jackson, the United States conducted Indian removal in the 1830s in the Southeast, and most of the Choctaw were removed to west of the Mississippi River, to land in Indian Territory, now part of Oklahoma.

Neshoba was founded by European American settlers in 1833. They named it after a Choctaw chief, whose name in the Choctaw language meant "wolf".

Descendants of the Choctaw who remained in the state continued to identify as Choctaw. They lived in relatively distinct communities and reorganized in the 1930s, gaining federal recognition as the Mississippi Band of Choctaw Indians. Even in the 1970s, eighty percent of their people continued to speak Choctaw.

Late 19th century to present
The white-dominated state legislature passed a new constitution in 1890, that effectively disenfranchised most freedmen and other non-whites, such as Native Americans. This exclusion was maintained well into the 20th century, but activists in the 1960s increasingly worked to restore voting rights throughout the state.

At various times, 76 post offices were established within the county. Around the turn of the 20th century, 40 small post offices were operating at the same time. By 1971, only the post offices in Philadelphia and Neshoba were still operational. Today, only the one in Philadelphia remains.

Neshoba County is known as the site of the lynching murder of three young activists in July 1964 during Freedom Summer in Mississippi, a period of education and a voter registration drive to prepare African Americans for voting. The three young men, two from the North, disappeared at a time of heightened violence, and they became the subjects of a state and FBI search. White supremacists were found to have murdered three civil rights activists: James Cheney, Andrew Goodman and Michael Schwerner near Philadelphia, the county seat. During the investigation, searchers found the bodies of eight other young black men in nearby locations. Deputy Sheriff Cecil Price was implicated and charged with being part of the group that lynched the three young men and buried them in an earthen dam 15 miles northeast of Philadelphia. Outrage over the crime contributed to congressional passage of the Civil Rights Act of 1964 and Voting Rights Act of 1965. The crime and decades-long legal aftermath of investigation and trials inspired the 1988 movie Mississippi Burning.

In 1980, Ronald Reagan launched his presidential campaign at the Neshoba County Fair to deliver a speech on economic policy and refer to states' rights. He was believed by some to be referring to southern conservative values, in an area associated with the 1964 murders and at a time when the Republican Party was attracting more white conservatives from the Democratic Party.

Geography

Major highways
  Mississippi Highway 15
  Mississippi Highway 16
  Mississippi Highway 19
  Mississippi Highway 21

Adjacent counties
 Winston County (north)
 Kemper County (east)
 Newton County (south)
 Leake County (west)

Demographics

2020 census

As of the 2020 United States Census, there were 29,087 people, 10,657 households, and 7,184 families residing in the county.

2000 census
As of the census of 2000, there were 28,684 people, 10,694 households, and 7,742 families residing in the county.  The population density was 50 people per square mile (19/km2).  There were 11,980 housing units at an average density of 21 per square mile (8/km2).  The racial makeup of the county was 65.50% White, 19.33% Black or African American, 13.80% Native American, 0.19% Asian, 0.02% Pacific Islander, 0.34% from other races, and 0.81% from two or more races.  1.16% of the population were Hispanic or Latino of any race. 28.6% identified as of American ancestry, 8.8% as Irish and 6.1% as English, according to Census 2000.  Those who identify as having "American" ancestry are predominantly of English descent, but have ancestors who came to the US so long ago that they identify simply as American.  88.7% spoke English and 10.2% Choctaw as their first language.

There were 10,694 households, out of which 34.90% had children under the age of 18 living with them, 52.50% were married couples living together, 15.60% had a female householder with no husband present, and 27.60% were non-families. 24.70% of all households were made up of individuals, and 11.50% had someone living alone who was 65 years of age or older.  The average household size was 2.63 and the average family size was 3.11.

In the county, the population was spread out, with 28.20% under the age of 18, 9.00% from 18 to 24, 27.00% from 25 to 44, 21.60% from 45 to 64, and 14.20% who were 65 years of age or older.  The median age was 35 years. For every 100 females there were 91.10 males.  For every 100 females age 18 and over, there were 88.30 males.

The median income for a household in the county was $28,300, and the median income for a family was $33,439. Males had a median income of $28,112 versus $19,882 for females. The per capita income for the county was $14,964.  About 17.90% of families and 21.00% of the population were below the poverty line, including 27.20% of those under age 18 and 22.00% of those age 65 or over.

Communities

Cities
 Philadelphia (county seat)

Town
 Union (mostly in Newton County)

Census-designated places
 Bogue Chitto (partly in Kemper County)
 Pearl River
 Tucker

Unincorporated communities
 Burnside
 Choctaw
 Good Hope
 Neshoba
 Sandtown
 Stallo

Politics

Education
School districts include:
 Neshoba County School District
 Philadelphia Public School District
 Union Public School District

Choctaw Tribal School System maintains Bogue Chitto Elementary School, Pearl River Elementary School, Tucker Elementary School, Choctaw Central Middle School, and Choctaw Central High School in the county.

See also
 National Register of Historic Places listings in Neshoba County, Mississippi
 Neshoba (film)
 Iris Kelso

Footnotes

Further reading
 Carol V.R. George, One Mississippi, Two Mississippi: Methodists, Murder, and the Struggle for Racial Justice in Neshoba County. Oxford, England: Oxford University Press, 2015.

External links
 Mississippi Region Grapples with Legacy of Civil Rights Murders, a 40th anniversary story from All Things Considered
 Neshoba Democrat's 40th anniversary stories

 
Mississippi counties
Mississippi placenames of Native American origin
1833 establishments in Mississippi
Populated places established in 1833